Jedlá is a municipality and village in Havlíčkův Brod District in the Vysočina Region of the Czech Republic. It has about 90 inhabitants.

Administrative parts
The village of Dobrá Voda is an administrative part of Jedlá.

References

Villages in Havlíčkův Brod District